JSF may refer to:

 JavaServer Faces (now Jakarta Faces), a specification for building web application user interfaces
 Jabber Software Foundation, now the XMPP Standards Foundation
 Joint Strike Fighter program, a military aircraft acquisition program begun in the 1990s
 F-35 JSF, alternative name of the resulting Lockheed Martin F-35 Lightning II
 United States Joint Strike Force, a faction in the video game Tom Clancy's EndWar
 Joint Strike Fighter (video game)
 Jatio Sramik Federation, a trade union federation in Bangladesh
 Jeux sans frontières, a European-wide television game show
 Jonathan Safran Foer (born 1977), American author